Aberavon (Seaside) railway station was a railway station on the Rhondda and Swansea Bay line which ran from the Rhondda Valley to Swansea on the Welsh coast in the county of Glamorgan.

History
The station was incorporated into the Great Western Railway during the Grouping of 1923, Passing on to the Western Region of British Railways on nationalisation in 1948, it was then closed by the British Transport Commission.

References

 Aberavon Seaside station on navigable O. S. map

Former Great Western Railway stations
Disused railway stations in Neath Port Talbot
Railway stations in Great Britain opened in 1895
Railway stations in Great Britain closed in 1962
1895 establishments in Wales
1962 disestablishments in Wales